The theta meson is a hypothetical form of quarkonium (i.e. a flavourless meson) formed by a top quark and top antiquark. Due to the top quark's short lifetime, the theta meson is expected to not be observed in nature.

See also
List of mesons

References

Mesons
Onia
Hypothetical composite particles
Subatomic particles with spin 1